The Church of the Holy Trinity, Privett, is a redundant Anglican church in the parish of Froxfield, Hampshire. It  is recorded in the National Heritage List for England as a designated Grade II* listed building, and is under the care of the Churches Conservation Trust.

History
In 1863, William Nicholson of the firm of J&W Nicholson & Co, gin distillers, bought the nearby estate of Basing Park.  Many of the buildings in Privett (now a conservation area) were built by him for workers on his estate, and the Church of the Holy Trinity was also built at his expense.  It was designed by Sir A W Blomfield and built between 1876 and 1878. A Chapel of the Holy Trinity at Privett was first recorded in 1391, but any remaining evidence of it disappeared when the present church was built on the same site.  The size of the new church far outstripped the requirements of the small rural parish, and it eventually became redundant in the 1970s.

Architecture

Sir Nikolaus Pevsner described the church as "exceptionally good" and like "a substantial town church".

Exterior
The church, in Gothic Revival (Early English) style, is built of flint with Bath Stone dressings. The chancel has north and south chapels or transepts, while the nave has four bays with aisles and clerestory, and a porch to the north.

Interior
The nave has four-bay arcades, a lofty tower arch, a square font on pillars with stiff-leaf carving, a round stone pulpit and an intricate wrought iron lectern.  The chancel is sumptuously appointed with a mosaic floor, sedilia and reredos with arcading.

Gallery

See also
List of churches preserved by the Churches Conservation Trust in South East England

References

External links
The Holy Trinity Church Privett

Church of England church buildings in Hampshire
Grade II* listed churches in Hampshire
Churches completed in 1878
Gothic Revival church buildings in England
Gothic Revival architecture in Hampshire
Churches preserved by the Churches Conservation Trust
Arthur Blomfield church buildings
1876 establishments in England